Marina Piredda (born 28 September 2002) is an Italian figure skater. She is the 2019 Toruń Cup champion, 2019 Cup of Tyrol bronze medalist, 2019 Dragon Trophy bronze medalist and 2020 Italian national silver medalist.

Career

Early years 
Piredda began learning to skate in 2006. Joanna Szczypa became her coach when she was about five years old.

Making her junior international debut, Piredda won silver at the Cup of Tyrol in February 2017. Continuing in the junior ranks, she took gold at the Dragon Trophy in February 2018 and Egna Trophy in April 2018.

2018–2019 season 
In September, Piredda debuted on the ISU Junior Grand Prix series, placing 13th in British Columbia, Canada. In December, she won the junior ladies title at the Italian Championships.

Piredda's senior international debut came in January 2019 at the Toruń Cup. After winning gold in Poland, she medalled at two other senior events, taking bronze at the Dragon Trophy in Slovenia and Cup of Tyrol in Austria. She was selected to represent Italy at the 2019 World Championships in Saitama, Japan.

Programs

Competitive highlights 
CS: Challenger Series; JGP: Junior Grand Prix

Detailed results 
Small medals for short and free programs awarded only at ISU Championships.

Senior results

Junior results

References

External links 
 

2002 births
Italian female single skaters
Living people
People from Cavalese
Sportspeople from Trentino
21st-century Italian women
Competitors at the 2023 Winter World University Games